St. François Xavier is an unincorporated urban centre located in the Rural Municipality of St. François Xavier, Manitoba, Canada. It is located about 15 km west of the city of Winnipeg on the Assiniboine River.

Settled around 1824 as Grantown, it is the second oldest settlement in Manitoba.

History 
 

The area of current-day St. François Xavier, commonly known as White Horse Plains (La Prairie du Cheval Blanc), was home to several distinct First Nations , such as the Cree and the Dakota.  The lands in the area supported numerous buffalo and other game animals.

Around 1824, Cuthbert Grant, who had recently led the Métis in the Battle of Seven Oaks, arrived in the area and was soon joined by many Métis families. The settlement was thereby founded, and named Grantown after Grant.

The Métis have since had a noticeable role in the municipality and throughout the province. 

In 1851, Father Louis-François Richer Laflèche accompanied the Métis buffalo hunters from the Parish of St. François Xavier on one of their annual hunts on the prairies. The hunting group, led by Jean Baptiste Falcon, son of Pierre Falcon (a Métis songwriter), was made up of 67 men, a number of women who came to prepare the meat, some small children and 200 carts. In North Dakota they encountered a band of Sioux. Laflèche dressed only in a black cassock, white surplice, and stole, directed with the camp commander Jean Baptiste Falcon a miraculous defence  against 2,000 Sioux combatants, using a crucifix at the Battle of Grand Coteau in North Dakota. After a siege of two days (July 13 and 14), the Sioux withdrew, convinced that the Great Spirit protected the Métis. 

The St. François-Xavier post office was opened in 1871 and closed in 1975.

Demographics 

Notable people 
Notable people buried at the St. Francois Xavier Roman Catholic Church and Cemetery include:
 Cuthbert Grant
 Patrice Breland
 Pascal Breland
 Pierre Falcon

See also
Métis buffalo hunt

References

 Geographic Names of Manitoba (pg. 238) - the Millennium Bureau of Canada

External links
 RM of St. François Xavier (Official website)

Saint Francois Xavier
Unincorporated urban communities in Manitoba
Unincorporated communities in Central Plains Region, Manitoba